Charles Cannon may refer to:

 Charles Cannon (Manitoba politician) (1866–1952), Canadian politician in the Manitoba government
 Charles Albert Cannon (1892–1971), American industrialist
 Charles Cannon (Quebec politician) (1905–1976), Canadian Member of Parliament for Îles-de-la-Madeleine
 Charlie Cannon (1911–2003), Mexican-born American entertainer
 Charles Craig Cannon (1914–1992), American military captain
 Chuck Cannon, American country music songwriter
 Charles Cannon (jockey), member of a significant family in British horse racing